Vice Admiral Sir Richard Innes Peek  (30 July 1914 – 28 August 2010) was a senior officer in the Royal Australian Navy, who served as First Naval Member of the Australian Commonwealth Naval Board from 1970 to 1973.

Naval career
Peek joined the Royal Australian Navy College in 1928 as a cadet midshipman and graduated with maximum honours. His specialist gunnery training followed, with the Royal Navy as was typical of the era, at Whale Island, Portsmouth. He was consolidating his training as a gunnery officer, serving in the battleship , at the outbreak of the Second World War.

While serving in HMAS Australia, Peek was injured during the kamikaze attack at the Battle of Leyte Gulf—that took the lives of Captain Emile Dechaineux and thirty others—and for his efforts immediately after was made an Officer of the Order of the British Empire for his "Skill, determination and courage" during the battle. Peek was additionally decorated with the Distinguished Service Cross for "Gallantry and skill" during assault operations on the Lingayan Gulf.

Lieutenant Commander Peek was posted to England after the war to undertake the Staff Course at the Royal Naval College, Greenwich, and also led the RAN contingent at the London victory celebrations on 8 June 1946, then the following year he attended the Joint Services Staff College.

After return to Australia Peek served in various positions before his promotion to commander. During the Korean War, he commanded the destroyer  and for his service was awarded the United States' Legion of Merit.

From 1954 he served as Deputy Chief of Naval Personnel. After promotion to captain he again commanded HMAS Tobruk from 1956 to 1958 and was also Captain (Destroyers) of the 10th Destroyer Squadron. The ship was part of the Malayan Emergency response. He was again posted to the Admiralty, and he also completed the 1961 course at the Imperial Defence College. From 1962 he commanded the aircraft carrier , and then the aircraft carrier and RAN flagship .

In 1964 he was promoted to rear admiral and appointed as the Fourth Naval Member and Chief of Supply of the Australian Commonwealth Naval Board. From 1965 to 1967, he was Deputy Chief of Naval Staff, and from 1967 was Flag Officer Commanding HM Australian Fleet, which included oversight of the British Commonwealth's Far East Strategic Reserve. In 1968, Peek was appointed as Second Naval Member and Chief of Personnel.

Peek was promoted to vice admiral in 1970 on appointment as First Naval Member. On 1 January 1971, he was appointment as a Companion of the Order of the Bath. He was further honoured, on 1 January 1972, when he was knighted via appointment as a Knight Commander of the Order of the British Empire. During his three-year tenure, the RAN's involvement in the Vietnam War ended, and he was heavily involved in restructuring the Navy as a result of the decision by the Whitlam government to combine the separate departments of the Navy, Army, and Air into the Department of Defence. Plans were well advanced for an Australian light destroyer (designated "DDL") and an RAN replenishment ship. The Australian government changed in 1972 and, due to the new Whitlam government's opposition to the planned DDL project, in August 1973 Peek advised the Government to not proceed.

Retirement and later life
Peek retired on 22 November 1973, and became a pastoralist in Monaro district of southern New South Wales near Cooma. He remained active in naval and military affairs, and campaigned for the welfare of veterans. His many activities included:
 Navy League of Australia - member, Advisory Council
 Championing the Far East Strategic Reserve Association.
 Patron of "A Just Australia", a lobby group for just policies and programs for refugees and asylum seekers
 In 2009, provided expert advice to the Australian Parliament regarding the 2009 Defence White Paper, Defending Australia in the Asia Pacific Century: Force 2030.

Family
Richard Peek died on 28 August 2010. Peek was predeceased by his first wife, Margaret, and his second wife, Catherine. He was survived by his son Matthew, and daughters Jane and Rachel.

References

1914 births
2010 deaths
Deputy Chiefs of Naval Staff (Australia)
Royal Australian Navy admirals
Australian military personnel of the Korean War
Australian military personnel of the Malayan Emergency
Australian Knights Commander of the Order of the British Empire
Australian Companions of the Order of the Bath
Australian recipients of the Distinguished Service Cross (United Kingdom)
Commanders of the Legion of Merit
Royal Australian Navy personnel of World War II
People from New South Wales
Graduates of the Royal Naval College, Greenwich
Military personnel from New South Wales